Zhexi Reservoir is a reservoir in Anhua County, Hunan, China.

Dam
The Zhexi Dam was built at the outlet of the reservoir. It was built from June 1958 to 1962, and the first generator was operational on 28 January 1962.

Public Access
Zhexi Reservoir open to visitors for free. It is a popular recreation area for fishing and tourism.

References

Reservoirs in Yiyang
Tourist attractions in Yiyang
Anhua County